The University of California's Kearney Research and Extension Center, the largest field station in the UC system, is an active extension facility dedicated to agricultural research. It is located on the border of the cities of   Parlier and Reedley, in California's heavily agricultural Great Central Valley.

The Kearney Research and Extension Center (KREC) was dedicated under the name Kearney Horticultural Field Station on May 26, 1965. The  plot of land between Parlier and Reedley called Mosesian Ranch was the site of the new station. Besides fields and orchards, KREC includes laboratories, greenhouses, insectaries, offices, trailers, volatile storage, GIS facility, and a small dormitory for visitors. Its 33 laboratory facilities include a postharvest fruit and vegetable lab, mosquito control lab, and biocontrol quarantine lab.

The main feature of KREC is the Kearney Agricultural Center. It employs 24 full-time research scientists, who are University of California faculty mainly affiliated with the campuses at Davis, Riverside, and Berkeley. Kearney Agricultural Center (KAC) employs an approximate total of 125 employees. Current and ongoing research underway at KAC include projects involved with postharvest technology, mosquito control, citrus pest management, plant breeding, noxious weeds, soil solarization, nematode biology, mealybugs, whitefly, Lygus bug, and groundwater management. Researchers are developing novel and specialty crops, such as blueberries, pitaya, jujube, and caper. Successful past projects include those on dust control, avocado growing, scale insects, and mulching. Many varieties of fruits, nuts, and vegetables have been developed at KAC and are currently grown and sold by farmers.

Also located at KREC is the Central Valley regional headquarters of the University of California Cooperative Extension, which brings the new methods and technologies of developed at the university to the farmers and business people who need it.

External links
Kearney Research and Extension Center
Kearney Agricultural Center

Further reading
"Agricultural Innovation Marks 40 Years at Kearney." California Agriculture vol. 59, no. 2 April–June 2005.

University of California
1965 establishments in California